Senator Goodloe may refer to:

John M. Goodloe (1858–1942), Virginia State Senate
William C. Goodloe (1914–1997), Washington State Senate